Hop-clover is a common name for several different plants and may refer to:

 Trifolium:
 Trifolium aureum
 Trifolium campestre
 Trifolium agrarium
 Trifolium dubium, thought by some to be the original Shamrock
 Medicago
 Medicago lupulina